Benjamin Abram Bernstein (20 May 1881, Pasvalys, Lithuania – 25 September 1964, Berkeley, California) was an American mathematician, specializing in mathematical logic.

Biography
With his Jewish family, Bernstein immigrated as a child to the United States. After completing public primary education in 1897 in Baltimore, he completed in 1902 his secondary education at Baltimore City College, and then received in 1905 his A.B. degree from Johns Hopkins University. After completing two years of graduate study at Johns Hopkins University, he became in 1907 an instructor and continuing graduate student in mathematics at the University of California, Berkeley. There he received in 1913, with supervisor Mellen W. Haskell, his Ph.D. At Berkeley, Bernstein became in 1918 an assistant professor, in 1923 an associate professor, and in 1928 a full professor of mathematics, retiring in 1951 as professor emeritus.

He was an Invited Speaker at the ICM in 1924 in Toronto. He was elected in 1931 a fellow of the American Association for the Advancement of Science. His doctoral students include Robert Levit and J.C.C. McKinsey.

In June 1920 in New York City, Professor Bernstein married Rose Davidson; her brother was the sculptor Jo Davidson. Bernstein was predeceased by his wife and upon his death was survived by a daughter and a granddaughter.

Selected publications
with A. O. Leuschner: 

 Errata for 1924 Trans. Amer. Math. Soc. vol. 26, pages 171–175: published Trans. Amer. Math. Soc. 27 (1925) 600. 

"On the Serial Relations in Boolean Algebras" Bulletin of the American Mathematical Society 32(5) 523,4 1926

with Nemo Debely: 

with Alfred L. Foster:

References

External links
Guide to the Benjamin Abram Bernstein papers, 1901–1963, Online Archive of California

1881 births
1964 deaths
Mathematical logicians
20th-century American mathematicians
Baltimore City College alumni
Johns Hopkins University alumni
UC Berkeley College of Letters and Science alumni
University of California, Berkeley College of Letters and Science faculty
Fellows of the American Association for the Advancement of Science
American people of Lithuanian-Jewish descent
Emigrants from the Russian Empire to the United States